Margarita Almendra Collinao López (born 12 December 2003) is a Chilean footballer who plays as a midfielder for Women's Championship club Colo-Colo and the Chile women's national team.

References

2003 births
Living people
Chilean women's footballers
Women's association football midfielders
Colo-Colo (women) footballers
Chile women's international footballers